That's Business is the debut album by the rock band Home Grown, released in 1995 by Liberation Records. Releasing in Europe via Burning Heart Records. It was the band's first album and established their presence in the prolific southern California music scene of the 1990s. It includes several songs that would become fan favorites such as "Surfer Girl" and "Face in the Crowd."

The album contains a hidden instrumental song at track 44, following 29 tracks of silence.

Track listing 
"Get a Job" (Tran)
"The Hearing Song" (Tran/Lohrbach)
"She Said..." (Lohrbach)
"My Friends Suck" (Tran)
"Alternative Girl" (Tran)
"Wanna-Be" (Tran)
"Surfer Girl" (Lohrbach)
"Ubotherme" (Tran)
"Face in the Crowd" (Tran)
"I Hate Myself" (Tran)
"One Night Stand" (Tran)
"Impotency" (Tran)
"Worthless" 
"Employer's Market" (Lohrbach)
"S.F.L.B."
 untitled hidden track

Personnel 
John "Johnee Trash" Tran - guitar, vocals
Ian "Slur" Cone - guitar, vocals
Adam "Adumb" Lohrbach - bass, vocals
Bob Herco - drums
Pat Gowan - backing vocals

Album information 
Record label: Liberation Records
Recorded at Westbeach Recorders in Hollywood, California
Engineered by Steve Kravac
Mixed and produced by Home Grown and Steve Kravac
CD cover and back tray art by Ron Ruvalcava Jr.
Disc artwork by Evans and Theos
Layout by Mean Street Graphics and Home Grown

References 

Home Grown albums
1995 debut albums